Anthea Turner: Perfect Housewife (also known as The Perfect Housewife with Anthea Turner) is a reality show that ran on BBC Three from 2006 to 2007 and is hosted by Anthea Turner. In each episode, two housewives are introduced who have difficulties running their home efficiently. Anthea helps them by giving tips in the art of housekeeping, homemaking and hostessing. After a two-week session their homes are revisited and one of the two contestants will be crowned as the Perfect Housewife.

Related books
How to Be the Perfect Housewife: Lessons in the Art of Modern Household Management, Virgin Books (29 March 2007)
How to Be the Perfect Housewife: Entertain in Style, Virgin Books (8 May 2008) 
The Perfect Christmas, Virgin Books (8 September 2008)

Broadcast
United Kingdom The Series was shown in the U.K. on BBC Three
 It was shown on Irish TV Channel TV3 Ireland. Re-runs are currently in progress.
 It was shown on Polish TV Channel TVN Style then TVN (Poland)

References

External links 

2006 British television series debuts
2007 British television series endings
2000s British reality television series
BBC reality television shows
English-language television shows
Television series by Banijay